Santa Fe Public Schools (SFPS) is a school district based in Santa Fe, New Mexico. The school district has a total of 31 schools: three high schools, three combined high/middle schools, three middle schools, and 21 elementary schools (of which five are community schools).

History

Stanley was formerly in the Santa Fe School District, which operated a school in Stanley, which in 1962 had 150 students. In 1962 that district's school board approved a plan to have the district moved to Moriarty Municipal Schools. Meanwhile Glorieta was to be moved to the Santa Fe district. The superintendent of the Santa Fe district advocated for closing the Stanley School because of the following reasons: was in close proximity to the one of Moriarty, that it would not be viable as an elementary only school if only the high school were closed, the poor physical state of the building and it was not meeting the academic benchmarks set by the state government of New Mexico.

Larry Chavez began his term as superintendent in 2021.

Service area
The school district serves, in addition to Santa Fe: Agua Fria, Arroyo Hondo, Cañada de los Alamos, Cañoncito, Chupadero, Conejo, Eldorado at Santa Fe, Encantado, Galisteo, Glorieta, Hyde Park, La Bajada, La Cienega, La Cueva, Las Campanas, Lamy, Los Cerrillos, Madrid, Rio en Medio, Santa Fe Foothills, Seton Village, Sunlit Hills, Tesuque, Tres Arroyos, Valencia, and Valle Vista. It also serves almost all of Tano Road, most of La Tierra, and a small portion of Peak Place.

Schools

High schools
 Academy at Larragoite
 Capital High School
 Mandela International Magnet School
 Santa Fe High School

Community schools (K-8)
 Amy Biehl Community School
 Also known as Amy Biehl at Rancho Viejo Community School, it has  of space. It was named after Amy Biehl. Pam De La O, the first principal, participated in the design of the school. 2010 was its planned year of opening.
 Aspen Community Magnet School (formed as merger from three other schools)
 Alvord Elementary (closed)
 Kaune Elementary (closed)
 Larragoite Elementary (closed)
 El Dorado Community School (Eldorado)
 Gonzales Community School
 Nina Otero Community School

Middle schools

 Milagro Middle School
 El Camino Real Academy 
 Edward Ortiz Middle School
 Mandela International Magnet School
 Monte del Sol Charter School (charter)
 Tierra Encantada Charter School

Closed:
 Alameda Middle School
 B.F. Young Middle School
 Harrington Junior High
 Leah Harvey Middle School
 Capshaw Middle School
 DeVargas Middle School

Elementary schools
 Acequia Madre Elementary
 Agua Fria Elementary (Agua Fria)
 Atalaya Elementary 
 Carlos Gilbert Elementary
 César Chávez Elementary
 Chaparral Elementary 
 E.J. Martinez Elementary
 El Camino Real Academy 
 Kearny Elementary
 Nava Elementary
 Piñon Elementary
 Ramirez Thomas Elementary
 Nye Early Childhood Center (Pre-K program)
 Salazar Elementary
 R. M. Sweeney Elementary
 Tesuque Elementary (Tesuque)
 Turquoise Trail (charter)
 Wood Gormley Elementary

Dress code
Beginning circa 1998 the district required elementary and middle school students to wear standardized dress (school uniforms). This was ended in 2018 as low income parents complained that the standardized dress caused their clothing expenditures to rise, and as teachers felt that policing the student dress caused too many absences and used too many class resources.

See also
Charter schools:
 Monte del Sol Charter School
 Tierra Encantada Charter School

References
 Santa Fe Public Schools

School districts in New Mexico
Education in Santa Fe, New Mexico
1896 establishments in New Mexico Territory
School districts established in 1896